Cyana rufifrons is a species of moth of the family Erebidae. It was described by Walter Rothschild in 1912. It is found on São Tomé Island.

References

rufifrons
Moths described in 1912
Insects of São Tomé and Príncipe
Fauna of São Tomé Island
Moths of Africa
Taxa named by Walter Rothschild